Nikolaos Salavrakos (born 15 February 1946 in Kalamata) is a Greek politician who was a Member of the European Parliament (MEP) from 2009 to 2014, representing the Popular Orthodox Rally.

References

1. Nikolaos Salavrakos profile page - Greek Member of European Parliament - Popular Orthodox Rally Party - accessed October 10, 2012.

External links
 

1946 births
Living people
Politicians from Kalamata
Popular Orthodox Rally MEPs
MEPs for Greece 2009–2014